Lutz Heßlich (born 17 January 1959) is a former racing cyclist from East Germany.

He competed for East Germany in the 1980 Summer Olympics held in Moscow, Soviet Union in the individual sprint event where he finished in first place. He missed the 1984 Summer Olympics due to the Soviet led boycott but returned to the 1988 Summer Olympics in Seoul, South Korea where he won a second gold medal in the individual sprint. In October 1986, he was awarded a Star of People's Friendship in gold (second class) for his sporting success.
Between 1979 and 1987 he was four times world champion in individual sprint.

Private life
Lutz Heßlich lives with his family in Cottbus where since 1989 he has run a bicycle shop.

His great grandfather, Walter Heßlich, was also a racing cyclist and his son Nico has embarked on a career as a competition racing cyclist in 2008.

References

1959 births
Living people
People from Ortrand
People from Bezirk Cottbus
East German male cyclists
Olympic cyclists of East Germany
Olympic gold medalists for East Germany
Cyclists at the 1980 Summer Olympics
Cyclists at the 1988 Summer Olympics
Olympic medalists in cycling
Cyclists from Brandenburg
Medalists at the 1980 Summer Olympics
Medalists at the 1988 Summer Olympics
East German track cyclists